In humans, the crotch is the bottom of the pelvis (the region of the body where the legs join the torso) and is often considered to include the groin and genitals.

Etymology
Crotch is derived from crutch; it was first used in 1539 to refer to a forked stick used as a farm implement. This region of the body is also described with other terms such as groin or the lower ventral area.

In clothing 
In clothing, the crotch is the area of trousers, shorts, leggings etc. where the legs join. The bottom of the crotch is an end of the inseam. The crotch-region on smaller garments such as underwear are sometimes referred to as the pouch. Loosely-fitted or bagginess in the crotch-region is sometimes associated with a lax, casual and easy-going approach to attires or garbs.

Clothing that is tight-fitting in the crotch produces an effect that is sometimes referred to by informal terms such as a man-bulge  or moose-knuckle  on men, and a camel toe on women, especially if the woman's labia majora are conspicuous. Prolonged constrictive pressure of the crotch on the male genitals may increase the likelihood of detumescing.

Scope 
The semantic field of the term crotch is sometimes expanded to include objects which have a similar shape to the anatomical human crotch. This may include botanical structures such as the area where tree branches are joined together or mechanical structures which fork or branch or where ramification takes place. The term had also been expanded to include the joining together of asymmetrical surfaces in cue sports equipment or the corners of  flat surfaces usually made of quarried slate.

Depictions in artwork 

The human crotch has been depicted in artwork. In Paleolithic art, forms called tectiforms or quadrilaterals have sometimes been interpreted to be "quick visual guides, reminders to the imagination" of the female crotch, and typically do not represent the crotch hairs.

Classical marble statues depict females without pubic hair; in contrast, statues of males "show curly pubic hair".

For much of the history of European art – "until the late seventeenth century" – references to the female crotch were approached from above: "Art usually expressed the sense of the vulva as a point at the bottom of the belly rather than as the meeting place at the top of the thighs."

Art therapists have noted "a triangular or vaginal shaped area in drawings by rape/sexual abuse victims".

References

Parts of clothing
Sexual anatomy

de:Schritt
nl:Schaamstreek
ne:जाङ्घ
tl:Pundya